Inna Gliznuta (born 18 April 1973 in Bender) is a Moldovan high jumper. She has competed at four Olympic Games.

She finished second at the 1992 World Junior Championships in Seoul, fourteenth at the 1993 IAAF World Indoor Championships in Toronto, eighth at the 1994 European Indoor Championships in Paris and fourth at the 2001 Summer Universiade in Beijing. She also competed in four Olympics, but failed to qualify from her pool.

Her personal best jump is 1.95 metres, achieved in June 1999 in Tel Aviv.

Achievements

Notes:
 Results in brackets indicate height achieved in qualifying round
 Results with a q indicate overall position in qualifying round
 At the 1992 World Juniors Gliznuta represented the Unified Team of the former Soviet Union.

References

External links

1973 births
Living people
People from Bender, Moldova
Soviet female high jumpers
Moldovan female high jumpers
Athletes (track and field) at the 1996 Summer Olympics
Athletes (track and field) at the 2000 Summer Olympics
Athletes (track and field) at the 2004 Summer Olympics
Athletes (track and field) at the 2008 Summer Olympics
Olympic athletes of Moldova
World Athletics Championships athletes for Moldova
Competitors at the 2001 Summer Universiade